The Bust of Camilla Barbadoni is a marble sculpture by the Italian artist Gian Lorenzo Bernini. Executed in 1619, it portrays the (deceased) mother of the Maffeo Barberini. Camilla had died in 1609. Barberini would become Pope Urban VIII in 1623.

See also
List of works by Gian Lorenzo Bernini

Notes

References

External links
 

Busts by Gian Lorenzo Bernini
Marble sculptures in Copenhagen
Busts in Denmark
Sculptures of the National Gallery of Denmark
1610s sculptures